Thura Aye Myint was the Minister of Labour of Burmese from 2013 to 2016.

Aye Myint contested the 2010 Burmese general election as a Union Solidarity and Development Party candidate, winning a Pyithu Hluttaw seat for the Mawlamyine Township constituency. He served as Minister of Science and Technology from March 2011 to August 2012 and as Minister of Industry from August 2012 to July 2013.

A military officer, Aye Myint is a former major general in the Myanmar Army. During the State Peace and Development Council era, he served as Minister of Sports, and Deputy Minister of Defense. Aye Myint was elected Deputy chairman of the Union Solidarity and Development Party, in office from October 2012 to August 2015 succeeded 2015 succeeded by Myat Hein, former Minister for Communications and Information Technology and retired general.
He is married to Aye Aye, and has a son, Nay Linn.

References

Government ministers of Myanmar
Living people
Burmese military personnel
Union Solidarity and Development Party politicians
Year of birth missing (living people)